Robert Plaga (born 21 July 1978) is a Czech politician and university teacher. He served as Minister of Education, Youth and Sports in the Cabinet of Andrej Babiš from December 2017 to December 2021. He is also member of ANO 2011 party. He is married and he has two children.

His post ended in 2021 after ANO 2011 lost the elections to the Chamber of Deputies in October. After that he became a Lieutenant of Minister of Education, Youth and Sports in Cabinet of Petr Fiala.

References

External links

1978 births
Living people
ANO 2011 politicians
ANO 2011 Government ministers
People from Ivančice
Education ministers of the Czech Republic
Mendel University Brno alumni